N-Cyclohexylmethylone  (cyputylone) is a substituted cathinone derivative with stimulant effects which has been sold as a designer drug. It was first identified in the United States in 2022.

See also 
 Methylone
 Ethylone
 Benzedrone

References 

Cathinones
Designer drugs
Cyclohexylamines